Ivanhoe is one of two commuter rail stations on the Metra Electric District main branch in Riverdale, Illinois.

Like the  station, Ivanhoe is built on a bridge embankment south of 144th Street, which also carries Amtrak's City of New Orleans, Illini, and Saluki trains. The waiting room is open 24 hours, is located on the north sidewalk, and contains ticket vending machines. Parking is available on the east side of the tracks on primarily north of Illinois Street between 144th and 145th Streets. Another parking lot is available across from this one on 144th Street, and a third can be found off the northeast corner of 144th Street and Atlantic Avenue. Street-side parking can also be found on 145th Street between Illinois Street and Atlantic Avenue in front of C. Kelly Franson Park. No bus connections are available at this station.

References

External links 

144th Street entrance from Google Maps Street View

Metra stations in Illinois
Former Illinois Central Railroad stations
Railway stations in Cook County, Illinois
Riverdale, Illinois